Scenes from a Marriage is a 1973 Swedish television miniseries written and directed by Ingmar Bergman. Over the course of six hour-long episodes, it explores the disintegration of the marriage between Marianne (Liv Ullmann), a divorce lawyer, and Johan (Erland Josephson), a psychology professor. The series spans a period of 10 years. Bergman's teleplay draws on his own experiences, including his relationship with Ullmann. It was shot on a small budget in Stockholm and Fårö in 1972.

After initially airing on Swedish TV in six parts, the miniseries was condensed into a theatrical version and received positive reviews in Sweden and internationally. Scenes from a Marriage was also the subject of controversy for its perceived influence on rising divorce rates in Europe. The film was ineligible for the Academy Award for Best Foreign Language Film, but won the Golden Globe Award for Best Foreign Language Film and several other honours. The miniseries and film version influenced filmmakers such as Woody Allen and Richard Linklater. It was followed by a sequel, Saraband, in 2003, and stage adaptations. It was also adapted into an HBO miniseries in 2021.

Episodes
The TV miniseries' six episodes ran between 11 April and 16 May 1973. At about 50 minutes per episode, the miniseries totals 282 minutes.

Scenes from each episode appear in the film version, which is 168 minutes long. The episode titles appear in the film version as chapter titles.

Cast

Production

Bergman wrote the teleplay for Scenes From a Marriage over three months. He drew on his personal experiences, including his relationship with Ullmann; his unhappy, eventually dissolved marriages to Käbi Laretei and Gun Hagberg; and the marriage of his parents, Karin and Erik Bergman. As a boy, he had witnessed his parents violently wrestling, with Karin slapping Erik and Erik pushing her against a wall. Ingmar also found his mother could be manipulative.

The budget for Scenes From a Marriage was approximately a third that of Bergman's previous film, Cries and Whispers. Half was covered by Swedish Television and half by foreign companies. It was filmed in Stockholm and Fårö between July and October 1972. Cinematographer Sven Nykvist emphasized close-ups and employed small indoor film sets. Nykvist later regretted not using more tracking shots when he learned the miniseries would have a theatrical release. The filming schedule was one week per episode.

Ullmann compared performing in Scenes From a Marriage to appearing in a documentary, saying she "felt very connected to the role." She said she was becoming more involved in the feminist movement while making the miniseries. Due to Ullmann and Erland Josephson's comfort with their parts, the crew saved time by not having rehearsals.

Release
Scenes From a Marriage was broadcast as a miniseries in Sweden by SVT2 beginning on 11 April 1973. Polls indicated most of the viewers were women. A 169-minute theatrical version was screened in Sweden on 28 October 1974.

In the United States, a 167-minute version of the miniseries was released in cinemas, with the 16 mm film modified to 35 mm. It opened in New York City on 21 September 1974. The full miniseries was later aired in the U.S. by PBS in March and April 1977, and numerous times in 1979. The Criterion Collection released the miniseries and theatrical version on a three-disc DVD in Region 1 in 2004, complete with interviews and an essay by Phillip Lopate.

Reception

Critical reception

In Sweden, Scenes from a Marriage received positive reviews for its dialogue and realism, with Mauritz Edstrom calling it "one of Bergman's finest human portrayals". Åke Janzon said that while the miniseries was not a masterpiece, it demonstrated psychological tension. Swedish director Maj Wechselmann criticized it on feminist grounds, saying it failed to criticize marriage roles. Bergman replied that the miniseries was meant to depict "Marianne's liberation" and female "suppressed aggressions". One controversy revolved around allegations that Scenes From a Marriage led to higher divorce rates in Sweden and around Europe by teaching couples to communicate their conflicts. Swedish divorce rates allegedly doubled one year after the miniseries was broadcast in 1973. In 2013 Rachel Halliburton disputed these allegations in Time Out magazine, remarking that sexual and women's liberation were gaining prominence at the time and that the miniseries "as such was as much a symptom of what was happening to modern marriage as a cause".

In the United States, Roger Ebert gave the theatrical version a full four stars, calling it "one of the truest, most luminous love stories ever made" and "the best film of 1973". Vincent Canby, chief critic for The New York Times, called the theatrical version "a movie of such extraordinary intimacy that it has the effect of breaking into mysterious components many things we ordinarily accept without thought, familiar and banal objects, faces, attitudes, and emotions, especially love. [...] Ullmann again establishes herself as one of the most fascinating actresses of our time." Canby also wrote that "Josephson gives an equally complex performance" but found the character less admirable. Don Druker of Chicago Reader criticized the editing for the cinema, saying that the film "shows its reassembled status rather badly" and that "moments of searing insight" were provided mainly by Ullmann.

The film was included in "The New York Times Guide to the Best 1,000 Movies Ever Made" in 2002. In 2004, essayist Phillip Lopate wrote that Scenes from a Marriage showed Bergman moving on from exploration of God's silence to the subject of men, women, love and intimacy. Lopate found the film version "more harrowing and theatrical," while the miniseries "has the tendency to intersect with and form a more quotidian relationship to viewers’ lives; its characters become members of the family, and their resilience over time, regardless of the incessant crises thrown them by the script, induces a more good-humored, forgiving atmosphere." In 2007, Kristi McKim of Senses of Cinema wrote that the film "stunningly exemplified" the "tension" in "the emotional causes and effects of feeling incompatible desires within the modern world." The film has a 94% approval rating on Rotten Tomatoes, based on 15 reviews. It was included on BBC's 2018 list of the 100 greatest foreign-language films.

Accolades
The National Board of Review named Scenes from a Marriage one of the top foreign-language films of 1974. It sparked controversy when its ineligibility for the Academy Award for Best Foreign Language Film was questioned. The supposed reason was that it aired on television before it played in cinemas, but at the time that did not necessarily render a film ineligible. In this case, it was because the TV broadcast occurred the year before its theatrical debut in 1974. The film's ineligibility prompted 24 filmmakers, including Frank Capra and Federico Fellini, to write an open letter demanding the rules for eligibility be revised.

Legacy

Bergman's 1980 television film From the Life of the Marionettes centres on a couple named Peter and Katarina, loosely based on the supporting characters of those names in Scenes from a Marriage. Bergman also wrote the first stage adaptation of Scenes from a Marriage for the Residenztheater in Munich in 1981. Saraband, a quasi-sequel set decades after the original miniseries, aired on Swedish television in 2003. In 2008, a theatrical adaption by Joanna Murray-Smith was performed at the Belgrade Theatre in Coventry, directed by Trevor Nunn and starring Imogen Stubbs and Iain Glen.

Knots Landing creator David Jacobs based the series on Scenes from a Marriage. Shashi Deshpande informally adapted it into the screenplay for Govind Nihalani's Drishti in 1990. In 1991, Woody Allen costarred in Paul Mazursky's Scenes from a Mall, a dark comedy about a deteriorating marriage. Allen's similarly realist 1992 film Husbands and Wives is also influenced by Scenes from a Marriage. Some critics compared Allen's Annie Hall (1977) to Scenes from a Marriage.

In an April 2011 New York Times Opinionator article titled "Too Much Relationship Vérité", Virginia Heffernan compares An American Family to Scenes from a Marriage: 

In June 2013, actor Ethan Hawke and director Richard Linklater said Scenes from a Marriage was the standard by which their Before Midnight must be judged. Russian director Andrey Zvyagintsev initially conceived Loveless (2017) as a remake of Scenes from a Marriage, with critics also comparing Zvyagintsev's finished product to Bergman's miniseries. Noah Baumbach's Marriage Story (2019) also contains references to Scenes from a Marriage.

References

Bibliography

External links
 
 
 Scenes from a Marriage: Natural Antagonists – an essay by Phillip Lopate at The Criterion Collection

1973 films
1973 drama films
1973 independent films
1973 Swedish television series debuts
1973 Swedish television series endings
1970s Swedish films
1970s Swedish-language films
1970s television miniseries
Adultery in films
Adultery in television
Best Foreign Language Film Golden Globe winners
Film controversies in Sweden
Films about abortion
Films about domestic violence
Films about divorce
Films adapted into plays
Films directed by Ingmar Bergman
Films set in Sweden
Films shot in Stockholm
Films with screenplays by Ingmar Bergman
National Society of Film Critics Award for Best Film winners
Swedish drama films
Swedish drama television series
Swedish independent films
Swedish television miniseries
Television controversies in Sweden
Television series about divorce
Television shows filmed in Sweden
Television shows set in Stockholm